Kristiina Rove (born 1990) is a Finnish alpine ski racer.

She competed at the 2015 World Championships in Beaver Creek, USA, in the slalom.

References

1990 births
Finnish female alpine skiers
Living people